The English people may refer to:
 the English people, a nation and ethnic group native to England.
 The English People (essay), an essay by English author George Orwell.